Choanotrema is a genus of trematodes in the family Opecoelidae. It was formerly named Choanostoma Yamaguti, 1934.

Species
Choanotrema plectorhynchi (Yamaguti, 1934)
Choanotrema secundum (Durio & Manter, 1968)

References

Opecoelidae
Plagiorchiida genera